The Norwegian High Command was Norway's top military leadership from 1970 to 2003. It was established in Northern Norway in 1940 by General Otto Ruge. It was then re-established by the Norwegian Government-in-exile in London in 1942, lasting until 1946. The High Command was re-established in 1970, lasting until 2003, when a different organization was formed.

World War II
The Norwegian High Command was re-established on 6 February 1942. Wilhelm von Tangen Hansteen was Chief of Defence until 1 July 1944, when Crown Prince Olav took over.

Organization
Among the offices were 
FO II, which dealt with intelligence.
FO-IV had "responsibility for the Armed Forces military operations in Norway and the cooperation with Milorg" including Special Operations.
FO's "hjemmekontor" (where Jacob Schive worked)

References

Military of Norway
Military units and formations established in 1940
Military units and formations established in 1942
Military units and formations established in 1970
Military units and formations disestablished in 2003